Shelley Madore is a Minnesota politician and former member of the Minnesota House of Representatives Madore served as a Minnesota State Representative for District 37A, Apple Valley-Burnsville, from 2007–2009. She had previously run unsuccessfully in 2004. She chose not to run for re-election in 2010, instead running as the Democratic nominee for Minnesota's 2nd congressional district. She lost to incumbent John Kline 63% to 36%.

Education
Madore holds a degree in business administration and spent fifteen years working in marketing and business management. She is a graduate of Partners in Policymaking through the Minnesota Council on Developmental Disabilities.

Minnesota Legislator
While a member of the Minnesota House of Representatives, Madore focused on the issues of transportation, education, health care, disabilities advocacy, conservation and property tax relief. She was made Vice-Chair of the Transportation and Transit Subcommittee and the Minnesota Public Transit Association (MPTA) named her a 2007 Friend of Transit. The Friend of Transit award was established to recognize excellence in public transit services and public transit advocacy in Minnesota.

Legislative accomplishments
 Minnesota State Representative, House District 37A, 2008-2009.
 Minnesota Public Transit Association "2007 Friend of Transit"
 First legislator to convene a Disabilities Working Group, focusing on transportation, housing, educational services, jobs and protection of vulnerable adults.
 Authored and passed HF1396, the first major piece of legislation to strengthen state guardian and trust regulations.
 Authored HF 3576, Medical Review Subcommittee and ombudsman authorized to gather data about deceased clients.
 Children's Defense Fund 2007 "Legislative Children's Champion"
 100% Rating by Conservation Minnesota for 2007.
 Recognized by St. Paul Radiology for helping pass the Freedom to Breathe Act for smoke-free workplaces.
 The Madore Amendment, which passed with bipartisan support, brought millions of dollars to Dakota County for road construction and maintenance.

Community service and policy advocacy
 Metropolitan Council for Independent Living (MCIL) board member
 Past member of the I35W Solutions Alliance
 Independent School District 196: Special Education Advisory Council, ECFE Advisory Council Legislative Committee
 Past member of the City of Apple Valley Urban Affairs Committee
 Past Neighborhood Organizer for National Night Out
 Past Family Facilitator for Arc Great Rivers
 Founder of a Cub Scout Pack designed to meet the needs of boys with Asperger Syndrome.

References

 

Living people
Democratic Party members of the Minnesota House of Representatives
Women state legislators in Minnesota
21st-century American politicians
21st-century American women politicians
1962 births